Gilberto "Tiba" Sepúlveda López (born 4 February 1999) is a Mexican professional footballer who plays as a centre-back for Liga MX club Guadalajara.

Club career

Guadalajara
Sepúlveda made his professional debut with Guadalajara on 8 January 2019, during a Copa MX group stage match against Cimarrones de Sonora in a 2–1 victory. He made his Liga MX debut with the club on 1 September, playing the entire match in a 1–1 tie against Cruz Azul.

International career

Youth
On 25 October 2018, Sepúlveda was called up by Diego Ramírez to participate in that year's CONCACAF U-20 Championship. As Mexico would finish runner-up in the tournament, he was listed in the tournament's Best XI. In April 2019, Sepúlveda was included in the 21-player squad to represent Mexico at the U-20 World Cup in Poland.

Sepúlveda participated at the 2020 CONCACAF Olympic Qualifying Championship, appearing in three matches, where Mexico won the competition.

Senior
Sepúlveda received his first senior national team call up by Gerardo Martino for the 2019–20 CONCACAF Nations League A matches against Panama and Bermuda in November 2019. On 30 September 2020, he made his debut with the national team in a friendly match against Guatemala, coming on as a substitute during the second half for a 3–0 victory.

Career statistics

Club

International

Honours
Mexico U23
CONCACAF Olympic Qualifying Championship: 2020

Individual
CONCACAF Under-20 Championship Best XI: 2018

References

External links
 
 
 

1999 births
Living people
Mexican footballers
Mexico under-20 international footballers
Association football defenders
C.D. Guadalajara footballers
Liga MX players
Tercera División de México players
People from Guasave
Footballers from Sinaloa
2021 CONCACAF Gold Cup players